Mount Lahaye is a mountain,  high, on the north side of Giaever Glacier in the Belgica Mountains of Queen Maud Land, Antarctica. It was discovered by the Belgian Antarctic Expedition, 1957–58, under Gaston de Gerlache, and named after Professor Edmond Lahaye, President of the Belgian National Committee for the International Geophysical Year, 1957–58.

References

Mountains of Queen Maud Land
Princess Ragnhild Coast